Ulmus × hollandica var. insularum was recognized as a biometrically distinct population of U. × hollandica endemic to all the Channel Islands and the Cotentin peninsula of France by Richens and Jeffers in 1975. The tree had been treated within U. montana (:glabra) until McClintock correctly assigned it to U. × hollandica.

Description
Var. insularum has an open canopy comprising irregular branching; the leaves are broadly ovate, < 8.5 cm long by 6 cm broad. The tree is distinguished from U. × hollandica and its most common cultivar, 'Vegeta', the Huntingdon Elm, by its longer (8–12 mm) petiole, greater foliar asymmetry, and more extensive axillary tufts on the lower surface of the lamina. Richens did not investigate the flowers and fruit.

Pests and diseases
The tree is very susceptible to Dutch elm disease.

Cultivation
The current status of the tree in the Channel Islands following the introduction of Dutch elm disease is not (2015) recorded.

References

Ulmus hybrids
Ulmus articles missing images
Ulmus